Tavria V is a chain of 119 shopping centers in Odesa, Bilhorod-Dnistrovskyi, Izmail, Chornomorsk, Mykolaiv, Khmelnytskyi, Kharkiv, Kyiv, Kherson. Key areas of business include: retail, wholesale, catering, production, construction and development, private label. Established in 1992, over 5000 workers employed. Every day, over 120,000 people shop at Tavria V shopping centers and supermarkets.
Tavria V retail chain’s target audience are urban dwellers with average and above average incomes. The shops offer a variety of products for both higher-income and lower-income clients. The latter is achieved by having specialized departments targeted at senior citizens.

The company has been the first in Ukraine to implement free bus routes for Tavria V supermarket visitors.

Online Home & Office Food Delivery Service for these cities in Ukraine is available.

Notes and references

Supermarkets of Ukraine
Retail companies established in 1992
Odesa Oblast